The Russia national bandy team represents Russia in international bandy. There is a national team for men's competitions and a Russia women's national bandy team. This article deals chiefly with the men's national bandy team.

Until 1991 there was a national bandy team for the Soviet Union, but a team formally representing the Russian SFSR made a one-off appearance at the Rossiya Tournament 1986, also playing against the Soviet Union team. At the Russian Government Cup 1992 (Rossiya Tournament with a new name), the independent Russia played amongst others against the Commonwealth of Independent States national bandy team, the brief successor of the Soviet team, before Russia was admitted to the Federation of International Bandy in June of the same year.

Russia became a member of the Federation of International Bandy following the dissolution of the Soviet Union in 1991.

The first time post-Soviet Russia played was at the Russian Government Cup 1992, when Commonwealth of Independent States also participated. CIS was considered the temporary successor of the Soviet team and consequently the number one team. After that tournament, CIS did not play again and in the 1993 world championship, Russia represented the country.  The team has won the Bandy World Championship twelve times, in 1999, 2001, 2006, 2007, 2008, 2011, 2013, 2014, 2015, 2016, 2018 and 2019. 

The men's 2020 Bandy World Championship was to be held in Russia but was postponed because of the COVID-19 pandemic, first to later in the year, then to 2021 and then to 2022 before being finally cancelled on 1 March 2022, after Finland, Sweden, Norway, and the United States announced that they would not take part in the competition in Russia due to the 2022 Russian invasion of Ukraine.

World Championship record

World Championship squad in 2016
Russian squad at the 2016 World Championship in Ulyanovsk, Russia, 1–2 February 2016, which won the World Championship title that year.

References

External links
Official site (in Russian)

National bandy teams
Bandy in Russia
Bandy
Bandy World Championship-winning countries